is a Shinto shrine that is located in  Ichinomiya, Aichi, Japan.  The honden is built in the nagare-zukuri style.

See also

Ōmiwa Shrine
Mount Miwa
Ko-Shintō

External links

Shinto shrines in Aichi Prefecture